Permanent Waves is the seventh studio album by Canadian rock band Rush, released on January 18, 1980, through Anthem Records. After touring to support their previous album, Hemispheres (1978), the band began working on new material for a follow-up in July 1979. This material showed a shift in the group's sound towards more concise arrangements and radio-friendly songs (such as "The Spirit of Radio" and "Freewill"), though their progressive rock blueprint is still evident on "Jacob's Ladder" and the nine-minute closer "Natural Science." Bassist/vocalist Geddy Lee also employed a more restrained vocal delivery compared to previous albums. Permanent Waves was recorded at Le Studio in Morin-Heights, Quebec with production handled by the group and Terry Brown.

Permanent Waves received a mostly positive reception from critics, and became the band's most successful album at the time of its release, reaching No.3 in Canada and the UK and No.4 in the United States. The album was certified platinum in the latter by the Recording Industry Association of America for selling one million copies. Rush released "The Spirit of Radio" as a single in February 1980 and toured in support of the album in 1980.

Background and writing
In June 1979, the band finished its eight-month tour of the United States, Canada, and Europe in support of its sixth studio album, Hemispheres (1978). The tour had taken its toll on the group and, for the first time in the band's history, each member agreed to take a six-week break before starting work on a new album. They regrouped in mid-July 1979 at Lakewoods Farm near Flesherton, Ontario to write and rehearse new material for two weeks. They set up their equipment in the basement and put down what Peart described as "a giant hodge-podge of instrumental mish-mash," initially titled "Uncle Tounouse", during the first session. The piece was not developed further, but sections of it were used as the basis of passages on other songs they would record. A typical day's schedule involved Lifeson cooking breakfast for the trio, after which Lifeson and Lee worked on musical ideas while Peart gathered his notes and walked to a nearby cottage to write lyrics, with "Entre Nous" being the only set completed prior to their arrival at Lakewoods Farm. This routine had a productive effect on the three, with "The Spirit of Radio," "Freewill", and "Jacob's Ladder" being put down within several days without considerable effort. The new songs marked a shift in the group's musical style towards more concise arrangements and radio-friendly songs, though Peart denied that the band consciously set out to produce commercial music. Peart attempted to write a song based on Sir Gawain and the Green Knight, the 14th-century epic set in King Arthur's time, but it was abandoned after it was deemed too out of place with the other material.

With some material prepared for Permanent Waves, Rush moved into Sound Kitchen Studio in northern Toronto, Ontario with their producer Terry Brown to put their ideas onto tape. "The Spirit of Radio," "Freewill" and "Jacob's Ladder" were further polished on the warm-up tour during soundchecks, and by early September, "The Spirit of Radio" and "Freewill" were being performed live on the band's warm-up tour in August and September 1979.

Recording

In September 1979, Rush headed to Le Studio in Morin-Heights, Quebec to record Permanent Waves with Brown and engineer Paul Northfield. Having recorded their previous two studio albums in Wales the band felt it was time for a change and initially chose Trident Studios in London, but cancelled due to the high costs of studio time and accommodation. The idea of working in a busy city environment became something they now wished to avoid and instead sought a remote location.

The recording sessions involved the band tweaking the settings of instruments and positioning of microphones. They recorded basic tracks with multiple takes until they captured the best performance. While Lee, Lifeson, and Brown began overdubs, Peart began attempting to write another longer song, and after enduring three days of writer's block, "Natural Science" was born. Fin Costello was then brought in to photograph the band in the studio. Cover art director Hugh Syme was also brought in and recorded a piano solo on "Different Strings". Music was composed for "Natural Science", with some parts reused from the discarded "Green Knight". The water sounds at the beginning of the song were created by splashing oars in the private lake, performed by Brown and studio assistant Kim Bickerdike, and the natural echo outside was used to record various instruments. The rough mixes on the album were complete, and the final mix was completed in two weeks at Trident Studios.

Upon the album's completion, Lifeson felt unsure about the record and for a period of time, could not listen to it due to his feeling that it failed to present any fresh ideas. His opinion changed when he first heard the album on the radio after its release, realising he had overreacted.

Songs
"The Spirit of Radio" featured the band's early experiments with a reggae style in its closing section, which was explored further on the band's next three albums, Moving Pictures, Signals, and Grace Under Pressure. The group had experimented with reggae-influenced riffs in the studio and had come up with a reggae introduction to "Working Man" on their tours, so they decided to incorporate a passage into "The Spirit of Radio," as Lifeson said, "to make us smile and have a little fun." Peart wrote the lyrics with Toronto radio station CFNY-FM in mind which had adopted the title as its slogan.

"Jacob's Ladder" uses multiple time signatures, and possesses a dark, ominous feel in its first half. Its lyrics are based on a simple concept: a vision of sunlight breaking through storm clouds. The title is a reference to the natural phenomenon of the sun breaking through the clouds in visible rays, which in turn is named after the Biblical ladder to heaven on which Jacob saw angels ascending and descending in a vision. Early in Rush's 2015 R40 Live Tour, Geddy Lee incorrectly stated that the song had never been played live before, but was corrected by fans on the internet (the song had been performed during the Permanent Waves tour and a live recording of the song was featured on Exit... Stage Left).

"Entre Nous", French for "Between us", did not receive heavy radio airplay and was not performed live until the Snakes & Arrows Tour in 2007.

While the band began stepping back from the epic song format on this album, the closing track "Natural Science" is more than nine minutes long and is composed of three distinct movements: I) Tide Pools, II) Hyperspace, and III) Permanent Waves. The lyrics are driven by concepts of natural science. It was featured, with a different arrangement, on the 1996 Test for Echo Tour, the 2002 Vapor Trails Tour, the 2007–2008 Snakes & Arrows Tour and the 2015 R40 Live Tour.

Artwork
The background scene comes from a photo, taken by Flip Schulke, of the Galveston Seawall in Texas during Hurricane Carla on September 11, 1961. The woman in the foreground is Canadian model Paula Turnbull, who was also featured on Exit... Stage Left (1981) and the man waving in the background is sleeve designer Hugh Syme. To create the appearance of Turnbull's skirt blowing in the wind, a fan was placed out of frame when she was photographed.

Release

Permanent Waves was released on January 18, 1980. It reached No. 3 in Canada and the UK and No. 4 in the US. In two months, the album had sold one million copies in the US.

Tour
Following the album's release, Rush supported Permanent Waves with a concert tour of Canada, the US, and the UK between January 17 and June 22, 1980. The group toured with a 25-member roadcrew who handled the 60 tons of equipment to stage the show, which included Boeing 707 landing lights, a $50,000 mixing console, and a screen projector behind the band. The tour cost $12,500 each day and each band member earned $1,000 per show.

Reissues

Track listing

Original release
All lyrics by Neil Peart except "Different Strings" by Geddy Lee. All music by Lee and Alex Lifeson.

40th Anniversary Edition (2020)

* Included on the vinyl release only
† Previously available on 2112 Deluxe Edition (2012)

Personnel
Credits are taken from the 1980 liner notes.

Rush
 Geddy Lee – lead vocals, bass guitar, Oberheim polyphonic synthesizer, Minimoog synthesizer, Taurus pedal synthesizer, Oberheim OB-1 synthesizer
 Alex Lifeson – electric and acoustic six- and twelve-string guitars, Taurus pedals
 Neil Peart – drums, timpani, timbales, orchestra bells, tubular bells, wind chimes, bell tree, triangle, crotales, cover concept

Additional personnel
 Terry Brown – arranger, producer, mixing
 Fin Costello – photography
 Robert Gage – hairdresser to the cover girl
 Bob Ludwig – remastering
 Adam Moseley – mixing assistant
 Craig Milliner – mixing assistant
 Paul Northfield – engineer
 Deborah Samuel – photography
 Flip Schulke – photography
 Ray Staff – mastering on original album
 Hugh Syme – piano, art direction, design, cover concept
 Paula Turnbull – cover girl (credited as "Ou La La")
 Robbie Whelan – assistant engineer

Charts

Weekly charts

Year-end charts

Certifications

References

External links
 

1980 albums
Rush (band) albums
Anthem Records albums
Albums produced by Terry Brown (record producer)
Albums recorded at Le Studio
Albums recorded at Trident Studios